Vladislav Igorevich Dubovoy (born 5 January 1989) is a Russian former professional footballer.

Club career
He made his professional debut in the Russian Second Division in 2008 for FC Nika Krasny Sulin.

He made his Russian Football National League debut for FC Chayka Peschanokopskoye on 7 July 2019 in a game against FC Chertanovo Moscow.

References

External links
 

1989 births
People from Tsimlyansky District
Living people
Russian footballers
Association football defenders
FC Nika Krasny Sulin players
FC Chernomorets Novorossiysk players
FC Rostov players
FC Chayka Peschanokopskoye players
Sportspeople from Rostov Oblast